Myanmar Radio National Service (formerly, Burma Broadcasting Service (BBS)), is the national radio service of Myanmar. It has its broadcasting headquarters in both the administrative capital of Naypyidaw and Yangon, Myanmar's largest city. The service runs Myanmar Radio and Myanmar Radio Minorities Service. Like all legally operating radio stations in Myanmar, such as Yangon City FM and Mandalay City FM, Myanmar Radio is under state management.

MRNS, alongside all other state-controlled media, is the mouthpiece of successive Burmese governments. However, due to a recent revamp in giving greater air time to music and pop topics, the state-affiliated radio services are, despite their affiliation with the government, popular with the populace. However, in terms of audience for news programmes, MRNS is least popular (and perceived as least credible). Most Burmese listen to foreign based pro-opposition radio services.

History
Radio service in Myanmar first came on air in 1936 during the British colonial era. Regular programming by Bama Athan ("Voice of Burma") began in 1946 when the British established Burma Broadcasting Service (BBS), carrying Burmese language national and foreign news and musical entertainment, knowledge reply and school lessons and  English language news and music programming. After independence in 1948, it was named Myanma Athan (also meaning Voice of Burma, but with the more formal term "Myanmar").

The service was renamed Myanmar Radio by the military government which came to power in 1988. The radio service's parent, the Burmese Broadcasting Service was also renamed as Myanmar Radio and Television (MRTV) in 1997.

Until the launch of Yangon City FM in 2001, BBS/Myanmar Radio was the only radio station in the country. For years, its main broadcast center is at 426 Pyay Road in Kamayut in Yangon. Since late 2007, the main broadcast station has moved to Naypyidaw. Yangon Station now mostly relays Naypyidaw Station's programming.

Broadcast service
Since the first high frequency (HF) installations back in the 1950s, the service's HF transmitter capacity has not had a major upgrade. However, there have been some minor frequency adjustments, with 4725 replacing the former 4795 and 5040, 7185 replacing 7125 and 7120, and 9730 replacing 9725 and 6035.

Station

References

Radio stations in Myanmar
Radio stations established in 1946
Mass media in Yangon
Mass media in Naypyidaw
1946 establishments in Burma